Podosorus is a monotypic genus of ferns belonging to the family Polypodiaceae. The only species is Podosorus angustatus.

The species is found in Philippines.

References

Polypodiaceae
Monotypic fern genera